The following is a complete episode list for Callan, given in broadcast order, with Edward Woodward in the title role. There was a total of 44 episodes produced and broadcast between 1967 and 1972. The show's first two series were made in black and white, the third and fourth in colour. Of the 22 black and white episodes, ten are missing from the archives; both the colour series exist complete. All the surviving episodes have been released by Network DVD.

Pilot
The pilot was broadcast in black and white.

Overview
Callan has been fired from an anonymous government agency known as "The Section" which is run by Colonel Hunter. ("Hunter" is a pseudonym for the current Section Chief, like the C of SIS.) The Section removes those who pose a danger to the "innocent" by persuasion, blackmail, extortion or death. David Callan had been the Section's top operator but he had become too curious about his targets and the rationale for their removal. The Section considered him vulnerable, volatile and dangerous and had laid him off to a dead-end book-keeping job for an ungrateful employer. Callan is where Hunter can keep an eye on him and also in daily, casual and unknowing contact with his next victim. If he can kill Schneider after making his acquaintance as a fellow war games enthusiast then he can kill anyone: this is the question to which Hunter urgently requires an answer.

Hunter describes Callan as "a dead shot, with the cold nerve to kill" and considers him far too useful to be allowed to retire. In this screenplay, Hunter invites Callan back to the Section to remove Schneider as a favour. Schneider's nefarious activities are known to the authorities but he is too clever to be caught by normal methods. Hunter wants Schneider eliminated but offers Callan no help from the Section—ostensibly to allow Callan to prove his loyalty and dedication. Hunter secretly sends Toby Meres to set Callan up to take the fall for the assassination, should this become necessary.

Callan's curiosity about his victims overwhelms him again and he investigates Schneider, discovering a massive gun-running operation. Satisfied, Callan formulates his plan. He calls on his petty criminal contact Lonely, played by Russell Hunter. Lonely is unsure of Callan's identity and motives but fearfully provides a "Noguchi .38 Magnum" plus 20 rounds (and returning the .38 revolver he had previously purchased from Lonely for killing Schneider). Callan has a chance meeting with Schneider and finds common ground in their interest in model soldiers and war games.

At Schneider's house, where Callan and his host re-play a scenario from the Peninsular War and go on to recreate the Battle of Gettysburg, Meres breaks in, distracting Callan. Hunter sends the police in order to ensure Callan is caught red-handed. Schneider, suspicious, uncovers Meres and holds the two men at gunpoint. Schneider searches Callan but misses the Magnum and Callan kills Schneider.

Meres attempts to finish the set-up but Callan knocks Meres unconscious. Callan phones Hunter about Schneider and says he will leave Meres to the police, and that he is quitting the Section. He tells Hunter "I liked Schneider... but I hate you". Hunter orders Callan's file to be changed to a red folder—targeting him for removal.

Series 1
This series was broadcast in black and white.

Overview
ABC then commissioned a series of six episodes in 1967. In the first episode Callan rejoins the section in an unofficial capacity. The series was characterised by Callan's stand-off, barely-respectful relationship between him and his boss. Hunter schemed to retain Callan on his side and would play him off in little divide-and-rule scenarios with or against his fellow agents to keep control. It was not always apparent that it worked. Callan's contact Lonely (Russell Hunter) developed into an unofficial sidekick, whose shadowing qualities outshone his sense of personal hygiene, something Meres in particular took joy in pointing out. Lonely remained ignorant of Callan's real work and believed him to be something of a gangland villain.

Series 2
This series was broadcast in black and white.

Overview
By 1969, ABC Weekend Television had, via enforced merger, become Thames Television. A second season of fifteen episodes that had already been completed by ABC was therefore transmitted by its successor. This run ended with "Death of a Hunter" in which the Section chief meets his demise, and Callan is shot – perhaps fatally. It had not been decided whether the show would return for a third series, so this device was used to leave open either the possibility of more stories in the future, or a way of winding-up the show. Two endings were taped, in which Callan either lived or died. In the end, Thames decided to bring the programme back for the 1970 series, this time in full colour and consisting of nine episodes.

In the television series, successive Hunters were played by Ronald Radd, Derek Bond, Michael Goodliffe and William Squire. The last's portrayal of a steely exterior, delivering ice-cold decisions with an underplayed theatrical flair, made for a match for Callan. Squire is probably the best remembered of all the supporting actors who played Hunter as a result.

Toby Meres was brought to life by Anthony Valentine (Peter Bowles in the pilot), an upper class thug whose demeanour barely concealed the cold and calculating thug he truly was. Meres enjoyed his work very much without questioning, a value Hunter found extremely useful and one which irritated Callan no end. Yet, as colleagues in the field, whose lives may depend on each other at a moment's notice, Meres and Callan developed an edgy, mutual respect. Meres departed for a posting in the USA at the end of the second series (in truth, Valentine left to appear in the series Codename on the rival BBC network).

Series 3
This series was broadcast in colour.

Overview
The third series of nine episodes, the first in colour, saw Callan still recovering from having been shot and struggling to come to terms with his situation. Interviews with Snell (the Section's doctor) and poor shooting range results with cardboard cutouts of people portray Callan as having lost his aggression and whose future with the Section looks to be in serious doubt. If Callan is to be of any use to Hunter, something has to spark him into life. In league with Meres's brasher, edgier and unpredictable replacement, James Cross (played by Patrick Mower), Hunter concocts a scenario whereby Callan's energies are incited into real emotion that can be turned against the enemy. The remaining eight episodes see the revitalised yet ever-more world-weary assassin cover more ground, including one episode where love comes unexpectedly into his life again, and which has the (expected) unexpected ending.

Cross is an agent whose arrogance more than matches that of his predecessor Meres, however, his lack of years means he requires more nurturing by his vastly more experienced mentor. This includes the necessary teaching of lessons more than once in a while. When it became known that Patrick Mower would be leaving halfway-through Series 4 (to head up "Special Branch"), Cross's character was developed, getting increasingly unpredictable and coming under the scrutiny of Snell, the Section's doctor, until his ultimate demise which was apparently of his own choosing. This paved the way for a more mature Meres to return from his secondment in Washington and help finish the series off.

Series 4
This series was broadcast in colour.

Overview
The final set of thirteen episodes was broadcast in 1972. This saw Callan develop further than before. An unsuccessful mission means Callan is being interrogated in a Russian prison, but is exchanged with the Russians for one of their agents. Now he is known, he has become a liability. What to do with the Section's top agent is later solved by promoting him into the role of Hunter – a post he dislikes as much, or even more, than serving under a Hunter. However, this move by his masters has motives, and Callan is eventually relieved of his duties after an incident where he enters the field of duty, which is against the rules. He is replaced as Hunter by his predecessor. The final three episodes form a trilogy based around a defecting Soviet agent, Richmond, played by T. P. McKenna, which was sub-titled "The Richmond File".

After an attempt at subtle interrogation and de-briefing in a remote location, Richmond dodges Callan and other guards outside. The 'defecting' line proves to be an elaborate cover. Richmond's brief is to carry out an assassination on British soil and the section needs to stop him. At the end of lengthy cat-and-mouse games, both men duel it out among crowds of containers inside a warehouse. Callan finally gains the upper hand. Richmond – knowing exactly how he would be treated – pleads for Callan to kill him instead of capturing him, which Callan does. Having disobeyed orders to help A Man Like Me (final episode title), Callan finally walks out of the Section knowing that his file will be placed into a red folder.

Reunion television film
The reunion television movie was broadcast in colour.

Overview
In the 1981 feature-length television story Wet Job, written by Mitchell and produced by ATV (without the original theme music or logo) Callan has become the proprietor of a military memorabilia shop when he is recruited by the new Hunter for one more job. Alas, he has to do this alone: Lonely has become a dapper gent, engaged to be married, and with enough self-confidence to defy Callan's request for help. In the end, Callan completes the task, survives and even ends up with a girlfriend.

References

External links
 IMDB Listing of 'Callan'

Lists of British espionage television series episodes
Lists of British drama television series episodes
Lists of British action television series episodes